Alexander Frank Gorgal (January 16, 1900 – June 1, 1986) was an American football player who played as a wingback for the Rock Island Independents of the National Football League (NFL). He was the father of Ken Gorgal. In the 1940s he was a policeman in Peru, Illinois.

References

1900 births
1986 deaths
Rock Island Independents players
People from Peru, Illinois
Polish players of American football